The year 2003 is the 2nd year in the history of the Universal Reality Combat Championship, a mixed martial arts promotion based in the Philippines. In 2003 the URCC held 2 events beginning with, URCC 2: Night of Champions.

Events list

URCC 2: Night of Champions

URCC 2: Night of Champions was an event held on April 12, 2003 at Phil Sports Arena in Pasig City, Metro Manila, Philippines.

Results

URCC 3: Siege at the Fort

URCC 3: Siege at the Fort was an event held on September 20, 2003 at The Fort in Taguig, Metro Manila, Philippines.

Results

See also
 Universal Reality Combat Championship

References

Universal Reality Combat Championship events
2003 in mixed martial arts